Babalwa Lobishe is a South African politician who has represented the African National Congress (ANC) in the Eastern Cape Provincial Legislature since 2019. In December 2021, she was additionally elected as Regional Chairperson of the ANC's branch in Nelson Mandela Bay, where she formerly represented the party as a local councillor.

Political career 
Lobishe formerly represented the ANC as a local councillor in the Nelson Mandela Bay Metropolitan Municipality, where she served as a Member of the Mayoral Committee under Mayors Ben Fihla and Danny Jordaan. She was elected to the Eastern Cape Provincial Legislature in the 2019 general election, ranked 29th on the ANC's provincial party list. Midway into the legislative term, ahead of the 2021 local elections, she was ranked first on the list of candidates nominated by ANC members to stand for election to the Nelson Mandela Bay council, which also made her a frontrunner for the mayoral candidacy; however, she retained her seat in the legislature rather than returning to local government. 

In December 2021, Lobishe stood for election as Regional Chairperson of the ANC's branch in Nelson Mandela Bay, running against the former incumbent, Andile Lungisa. She was elected unopposed on 17 December after Lungisa withdrew from the race, saying that he supported the election of a woman to the position; She served alongside Regional Secretary Luyolo Nqakula and was deputised by Siphiwo Tshaka. According to the Mail & Guardian, she was generally viewed as a close ally of Eastern Cape Premier Oscar Mabuyane, who in turn was politically aligned to President Cyril Ramaphosa; however, in 2022 she supported Mlibo Qoboshiyane's unsuccessful bid to oust Mabuyane as ANC Provincial Chairperson.

References

External links 
 

African National Congress politicians
Living people
Year of birth missing (living people)
Members of the Eastern Cape Provincial Legislature
21st-century South African politicians